Vortex Optics is an American manufacturer of special optical equipments for hunting, wildlife watching, outdoor recreation, shooting sports and law enforcement and military.  Vortex products include binoculars, spotting scopes, riflescopes, reflex sights, holographic sights and other accessories.  It once had a sister company known as Eagle Optics, which developed high quality optics for birdwatchers.

History
Vortex Optics is a DBA of Sheltered Wings, Inc., which was incorporated in Wisconsin in 1989.  Sheltered Wings, Inc. DBA Vortex Optics began in 2002.

In 2022 after extensive research, testing and reviews Vortex became an official supplier and contractor to the American Military as the U.S. Army selected Vortex‘s XM-157 fire control system for its Next Generation Squad Weapon program.

Products
Vortex Optics is based in Barneveld, Wisconsin, and currently sells binoculars, monoculars, spotting scopes, riflescopes, red dot sights and related accessories.
Riflescopes
 AMG (American Made Glass)
 Razor HD series
 Viper series
 Golden Eagle HD
 Strike Eagle
 Venom
 Diamondback series
 Crossfire II
 Copperhead

Red dot sights
 Razor
 Viper
 Venom
 SPARC II
 Strikefire II
 Crossfire
 Spitfire

Holographic sight
 Razor AMG UH-1 (Gen II released on mid July, 2020)

Binoculars

 Razor UHD
 Razor HD
 Kaibab HD
 Fury HD
 Viper series
 Vulture
 Hurricane
 Diamondback
 Crossfire
 Raptor
 Vanquish

Monoculars
 Recce Pro HD
 Recon
 Solo

Spotting scope
 Razor HD
 Viper HD
 Diamondback

Rangefinder
 Fury HD
 Ranger
 Impact

Tripods
 Summit SS-P
 Pro GT
 High Country

References

External links
 Vortex Optics website
 Vortex red dot sights comparison

Companies based in Wisconsin
Middleton, Wisconsin
Optics manufacturing companies
American brands